Hemigastrodrilus is a genus of annelids belonging to the family Hormogastridae.

The species of this genus are found in Europe.

Species:

Hemigastrodrilus monicae

References

Annelids